Kay Gee may refer to:

 Kay Gee, Indian cinematographer, see Silsila, Deewaar
 KayGee, American DJ and record producer
 Kier Gist, or KayGee, member of Naughty by Nature

See also
K-Gee, British music producer and songwriter
Kay Gees, funk and disco band